"Fiesta De Los Tamborileros" is the debut single by Dutch house group The Sunclub. The song was released in 1996 as the first single from their debut album, Fiesta. The song was re-released in 1998 with vocals by Angie Blake as "Fiesta '98". In 2000, the song was sampled by The Underdog Project on their single "Summer Jam", which was a European hit in 2003. In 2007, "Fiesta" was re-released as "Fiesta Reloaded" with new remixes.

Track listing
CD single
"Fiesta De Los Tamborileros" (radio edit) – 3:34
"Fiesta De Los Tamborileros" (video edit) – 3:56
"Fiesta De Los Tamborileros" (Sun Tan mix) – 5:37
"Fiesta De Los Tamborileros" (Forrest Dream mix) –  8:54

Charts

Weekly charts
"Fiesta De Los Tamborilero"

"Fiesta Reloaded"

Year-end charts
"Fiesta De Los Tamborilero"

References

1996 singles
1997 singles
1998 singles
2007 singles
1996 songs
Electronic songs
House music songs